Platycheirus modestus , also known as the yellow sedgesitter, is an uncommon species of syrphid fly observed throughout Northern North Amnerica. Hoverflies can remain nearly motionless in flight. The adults are also  known as flower flies for they are usually found on flowers from which they get both energy-giving nectar and protein-rich pollen. Larvae are aphid predators.

References

Diptera of North America
Hoverflies of North America
Syrphinae
Insects described in 1926